Living the Dream or variants may refer to:

Television and film
 Living the Dream (New Zealand TV series), a 2004 New Zealand reality show parody
 Living the Dream (British TV series), a comedy drama series, 2017 
 Jonas Brothers: Living the Dream, an American reality series
 "Living the Dream" (Big Little Lies), an episode of the HBO series Big Little Lies
 "Living the Dream" (Dexter), an episode of the American series Dexter
 "Living the Dream" (House), an episode of the American series House
 "Living the Dream" (My Family), an episode of the UK series My Family
 "Livin' the Dream", an episode of the American series The Office
 Living the Dream (film), a 2006 film directed by Christian Schoyen
 Goal! 2: Living the Dream, a 2007 film

Music
 Living the Dream (Jennylyn Mercado album), 2004
 Living the Dream (Luca Hänni album), 2013
 Livin' the Dream (album), a 2017 album by Nathan Carter
 Living the Dream (Slash album), 2018
 Living the Dream (Uriah Heep album), 2018
 "Livin' the Dream" (song), a 2015 song by Drake White
 "Living the Dream" (Five Finger Death Punch song) 2020

See also 
 Living a Dream, a 2005 album by Katherine Jenkins
 LTD (disambiguation)
 Living in a Dream (disambiguation)